Callville Wash is an ephemeral stream or wash in Clark County, Nevada. It was named for Callville the riverport settlement founded in 1866, at its mouth where it had its original confluence with the Colorado River.

Its mouth is at its confluence with Callville Bay, at an elevation of  when Lake Mead is at its full level.

Callville Wash originally had a tributary, originally known as West Fork Callville Wash, whose confluence with Callville Wash is now under Callville Bay.

History 
Callville Wash was part of the original 1829 Armijo Route of the Old Spanish Trail along the Colorado River, between the mouth of the Virgin River and mouth of Las Vegas Wash. That trail route bypassed the deep narrow gorge of Boulder Canyon through the Black Mountains by way of Boulder Wash, Pinto Valley and Cottonwood Spring to upper Callville Wash which it then followed down to the river.  Later the road between St. Thomas and Callville passed along this wash then northeasterly toward St. Thomas.

References

Tributaries of the Colorado River in Nevada
Rivers of Clark County, Nevada
Lake Mead
Washes of Nevada
Callville Wash
Old Spanish Trail (trade route)